Ghana Water Company (formerly Ghana Water and Sewerage Corporation, Aqua Vitens, and Rand Limited) is the majority provider of water utility services in Ghana.

History
In the pre-colonial era, inhabitants of what is now Ghana primarily drew their water directly from natural sources such as streams, lakes, and rivers. Prior to World War I, the first public water system was established in the then Gold coast by the British who were then colonizing the Gold Coast. In by that time the 1920s, other major towns and cities started having water systems which were built purposely to be used in some urban areas, including Winneba, Kumasi, and the then colonial capital Cape Coast.

Ghana Water Company Limited was established on 1 July 1999, following the conversion of Ghana Water and Sewerage Corporation into a state-owned limited liability company under the Statutory Corporations (Conversion to Companies) Act 461 of 1993 as amended by LI 1648.

Locations and operations
GWCL has offices and stations across Ghana including regional and district offices which oversee the provision of potable water in their respective geographic locations and has its head Office in Accra.

Water treatment plants 
Weija

Kpong

Dallung

Regional  Contacts 
ACCRA WEST REGION

 Postal address: P. O Box DC 998, Dansonman 

CENTRAL  REGION

 Postal address: P.O Box 377, Cape Coast

ASHANTI SOUTH REGION

 Postal address: P.O Box KS 767, Kumasi

ASHANTI NORTH  REGION

 Postal address: P.O Box KS 767, Kumasi

VOLTA REGION

 Postal address: P.O Box 41, HO

BRONG AHAFO REGION

 Postal address: P.O Box 88, Sunyani

EASTERN REGION

• P.O. BOX 406 Koforidua

UPPER WEST REGION 
P.O. BOX 39 Wa

References

External links
 GWCL Website

Water supply and sanitation in Ghana

Water supply and sanitation in Ghana